Lo Essential de Maná is a three CD box set of the first three studio albums under recording label WEA Latina from Mexican rock band Maná. Since they burst on the scene from Guadalajara, Mexico, in the early 1990s, Maná have reigned as the premier Latin rock band of our time. Led by the powerful and passionate vocalist-composer Fher Olvera, drummer Alex González, guitarist Sergio Vallín, and bassist Juan Diego Calleros blend American power rock with Hispanic folk idioms and Afro-Caribbean rhythms. This three-CD box set compilation contains the band's greatest hits, from their début album, Falta Amorto their third album Cuando Los Ángeles Lloran. A total of 37 songs from their favorites appear, including "Vivir Sin Aire," "Dónde Jugarán los Niños?", and the reggae-tinged "Selva Negra." Other favorites, such as "La Chula" and "Como Te Deseo," are remixed as pop-dance numbers.

Albums

Disc 1 (Falta Amor)

Disc 2 (¿Dónde Jugarán Los Niños? Special Edition)

Disc 3 (Cuando los Ángeles Lloran)

References

Maná compilation albums
2001 compilation albums